Ryan Montgomery may refer to:
 Ryan Daniel Montgomery, known professionally as Royce da 5'9", American rapper, songwriter, and record producer
 Ryan Montgomery (singer), American country music artist